Cañadas de San Pedro is a village in the Region of Murcia, Spain. It is part of the municipality of Murcia.

References 

Murcia
Populated places in the Region of Murcia